Employees' State Insurance Corporation (abbreviated as ESIC) is one of the two main statutory social security bodies under the ownership of Ministry of Labour and Employment, Government of India, the other being the Employees' Provident Fund Organisation. The fund is managed by the Employees' State Insurance Corporation (ESIC) according to rules and regulations stipulated in the ESI Act 1948.

History
In March 1943, Prof. B.P.Adarkar was appointed by the Government of India to create a report on the health insurance scheme for industrial workers. The report became the basis for the Employment State Insurance (ESI) Act of 1948. The promulgation of Employees’ State Insurance Act, 1948 envisaged an integrated need based social insurance scheme that would protect the interest of workers in contingencies such as sickness, maternity, temporary or permanent physical disablement, death due to employment injury resulting in loss of wages or earning capacity. The Act also guarantees reasonably good medical care to workers and their immediate dependents.
Following the promulgation of the ESI Act the Central Govt. set up the ESI Corporation to administer the Scheme. The Scheme thereafter was first implemented at Kanpur and Delhi on 24 February 1952. The Act further absolved the employers of their obligations under the Maternity Benefit Act, 1961 and Workmen's Compensation Act 1923. The benefits provided to the employees under the Act are also in conformity with ILO conventions.

The act was initially intended for factory workers but later became applicable to all establishments having 10 or more workers.
As on 31 March 2016, the total beneficiaries are 82.8 million...

ESI Act
Employees' State Insurance Corporation (ESIC), established by ESI Act, is an autonomous corporation under Ministry of Labour and Employment, Government of India. As it is a legal entity, the corporation can raise loans and take measures for discharging such loans with the prior sanction of the central government and it can acquire both movable and immovable property and all incomes from the property shall vest with the corporation. The corporation can set up hospitals either independently or in collaboration with state government or other private entities, but most of the dispensaries and hospitals are run by concerned state governments.

Benefits
As per the section 46 of the ESI Act, 1948, six benefits are envisaged to its subscribers.

1- Medical benefit

2- Sickness benefit

3- Maternity benefit

4- Disablement benefit

5- Dependants benefit

6- funeral expenses

For all employees earning  or less per month as wages, the employer contributes 3.25% and the employee contributes 0.75%, total share 4%. This fund is managed by the ESI Corporation (ESIC) according to rules and regulations stipulated there in the ESI Act 1948, which oversees the provision of medical and cash benefits to the employees and their family. ESI scheme is a type of social security scheme for employees in the organised sector.

The employees registered under the scheme are entitled to medical treatment for themselves and their dependents, unemployment cash benefit in certain contingencies and maternity benefit in case of women employees. In case of employment-related disablement or death, there is provision for a disablement benefit and a family pension respectively. Outpatient medical facilities are available in 1418 ESI dispensaries and through 1,678 registered medical practitioners. Inpatient care is available in 145 ESI hospitals and 42 hospital annexes with a total of 19,387 beds. In addition, several state government hospitals also have beds for the exclusive use of ESI Beneficiaries. Cash benefits can be availed in any of 830 ESI centres throughout India.

Recent years have seen an increasing role of information technology in ESI, with the introduction of Pehchan smart cards as a part of Project Panchdeep. In addition to insured workers, poor families eligible under the Rashtriya Swasthya Bima Yojana can also avail facilities in ESI hospitals and dispensaries. 
ESI Corporation also runs medical, nursing and paramedical schools in some ESI hospitals across India.

Medical and dental colleges
Employees' State Insurance Corporation runs medical, dental, nursing and paramedical schools in many locations across India. Presently, there are 11 medical colleges and 2 dental colleges established by the ESI Corporation. These colleges admit students on the basis of marks obtained in the competitive examinations conducted at the central level, the National Eligibility cum Entrance Test (NEET-UG).

There are 8 Medical Colleges managed by the Ministry of Labour and Employment, Government of India under the ESI Corporation. They are :

 ESIC Medical College and PGIMSR, Rajaji Nagar, Bengaluru, Karnataka
 ESIC Medical College and PGIMSR, K. K. Nagar, Chennai, Tamil Nadu
 ESIC Medical College and PGIMSR, Joka, Kolkata, West Bengal
 ESIC Medical College and PGIMSR, Faridabad, Haryana
 ESIC Medical College and PGIMSR, Sanath Nagar, Hyderabad , Telangana
 ESIC Medical College and PGIMSR, Kalaburagi, Karnataka
 ESIC Medical College and Hospital, Alwar, Rajasthan
 ESIC Medical College and Hospital, Bihta, Patna, Bihar

The administration of the remaining 3 medical colleges have been handed over to the respective State Governments under various MoU. They were established by the ESI Corporation but are managed by the state government since inception. They are:
 Government Medical College, Kollam, Kerala.
 Shri Lal Bahadur Shastri Government Medical College & Hospital Mandi, Himachal Pradesh.
 Government Medical College & ESI Hospital, Coimbatore

The Dental colleges run by the ESI Corporation are located in Rohini-ESIC Dental college Rohini,Delhi,and the other in Gulbarga, Karnataka.

The Government of India plans to construct 12 more ESI Medical Colleges in various cities across India in the upcoming years.

New Amendment
The Employees’ State Insurance Corporation (ESIC) raised the monthly wage limit to Rs. 21,000 from the existing Rs. 15,000, for coverage with effect from 1 January 2017. The rate of contribution was reduced from 6.5% to 4% ( employer's share 3.25% and employee's share 0.75%) effective from 1 July 2019.

Landmark Judgements

ESIC v/s Builders' Association of India 
Supreme Court of India Stays the applicability of the Employees' State Insurance to the Construction Workers.

ESIC vs Texmo Industries 
Conveyance/Travelling Allowance not to be consider as Wages under Sec. 2(22) of ESIC.

References

External links
 ESIC Headquarters Office

 
Financial services companies established in 1952
Health insurance in India
Labour relations in India
Indian labour law
Social security in India
Medical colleges in India